Jelena Patrnogić (15 April 1932 – 9 March 2010) was a Serbian artist and costume designer. She was born in Skopje, North Macedonia (then Yugoslavia), and worked as an artist and costume designer in North Macedonia, Serbia, Czech Republic and Slovakia, as well as collaborating with Croatian and Italian production companies. She held solo exhibitions, group exhibitions, and worked on dramas, operas, ballets, TV, films and fashion shows. She had won multiple awards, both individually and as a group. She died on 9 March 2010 in Kragujevac, Serbia.

Biography 
After secondary school of Applied Arts in Skopje she was awarded the BA degree of the Academy of Applied Arts in Belgrade, department of Costume and Fashion design.  

After she completed her degree, she started working in the Macedonian National Theatre in Skopje as a costume designer in 1960 where she remained until 1977. From 1977 she worked as a teacher of art in School of Applied Arts in Skopje until 1993, where she created the department of fashion design. During her work in the theatre and School of Applied Arts she also worked for TV, film industry and performed exhibitions around the country. 
She was a member of DLUPUM (Artists of Macedonia), ULUPUDS (Artists of Serbia), LUK (Artists of Kragujevac) and St. LUKA (Independent Artists).

Works and achievements as an artist
Solo exhibitions
 1973, Skopje, Macedonia (then Yugoslavia)
 2004, Kragujevac, Serbia
 2005, Kragujevac, Serbia

Group exhibitions
 1960, Applied Art in Macedonia, Skopje, Yugoslavia
 1963, State Exhibition of Souvenirs, Skopje, Yugoslavia
 1965, Exhibition of Scenography and Costumography, Novi Sad, Yugoslavia
 1968, Exhibition of Scenography and Costumography, Prague, Czech Republic
 1970, Exhibition of Costumography, Novi Sad Yugoslavia
 1974, Exhibition of Costumography in Macedonia, Skopje, Yugoslavia
 1978, Art Exhibition, Sarajevo, Yugoslavia
 1978, Art Exhibition, Skopje, Yugoslavia
 1983, Exhibition of Industrial Design
 1999, Annual Exhibition, LUK, Kragujevac, Serbia
 2000, Big Exhibition, St. Luka, Kragujevac
 2001, May Exhibition, St. Luka, Kragujevac
 2002, Saint Day Exhibition, St. Luka, Kragujevac
 2003, Exhibition of Paintings and Sculptures, St. Luka, Kragujevac
 2003, The First Triennale of Art of Kragujevac, Kragujevac
 2004, Annual, LUK, Kragujevac
 2004, Exhibition of Aquarelle, Sabac, Serbia
 2005, Annual and Exhibition of Drawings, LUK, Kragujevac
 2005, Annual, St. Luka, Kragujevac
 2005, Saint Exhibition’ St. Luka, Kragujevac
 2006, Annual, LUK, Kragujevac
 2006, Painting for Buda I Beba, St. Luka, Kragujevac
 2007, Annual, LUK, Kragujevac
 2007, Humanitarian Art Exhibition, TV Kragujevac, Kragujevac
 2007, Exhibition of Aquarelle, Sabac, Serbia
 2008, Annual and Exhibition of Drawings, LUK, Kragujevac
 2008, International Exhibition ‘Female Artists Majdampek’, Serbia
 2009, Annual and Exhibition of Drawings, LUK, Kragujevac
 2009, International Exhibition ‘Female Artists Majdampek’
 2009, Exhibition of Drawings ‘Brothers Stamenkovic’, Belgrade, Serbia
 2010, Exhibition of Drawings, LUK, Kragujevac
 2010, International Exhibition ‘Female Artists Majdampek’
Art colonies

 2000, ‘Sumarice’, Kragujevac, Serbia
 2001, ‘Kalenic’, Rekovac, Serbia
 2002, ‘I love Children, I play for Zvecanska’, Kragujevac
 2003, ‘Ilina Voda’, Kragujevac
 2004, ‘Svetosavska’, Kragujevac
 2005, ‘Medieval Serbian Rulers and their Legacy’, Stragari, Serbia

Works and achievements as a costume designer 
Dramas
From 1960 to 1984

‘Protection’ – B.Nusic, Macedonian National Theatre (MNT), Skopje, Yugoslavia
‘Bloody Wedding’ – F.G Lorka, MNT, Skopje
‘Pygmalion’ – B. Shaw, MNT, Skopje
‘Governor’s Death’ –  L. Uruckovski, MNT, Skopje 
‘Henry the Eight and His Six Wives’ – H. Griesinger, MNT, Skopje
‘Death and the Dervish’ – M. Selimovic, Theatre of Minorities, Skopje  
‘Young sons’ – V. Iljovski, MNT, Skopje
‘Electra’ – Sophocles, Theatre of Minorities, Skopje
‘Minister’s Wife’ – B. Nusic, Theatre of Minorities, Skopje
‘Othello’ – V. Shakespeare, Theatre of Minorities, Skopje
‘Nobleman’ – P. Molinier, MNT, Skopje
‘Man from Lescovac in Paris’ – B. Bobic, National Theatre, Nish, Yugoslavia
‘German Shepard’ – M. Krleza, National Theatre, Kragujevac, Yugoslavia
‘Hanka’ – National Theatre, Pristina, Yugoslavia
‘Wall, Water’ – Z. Cingo, Bratislava, Slovakia 

Operas
‘The Land of Smiles’ – F. Lehar, MNT, Skopje, Yugoslavia
‘Traviata’ – G. Verdi, MNT, Skopje
‘Albert Herring’ – B. Briton, MNT, Skopje
‘Tsar Samuel’ – K. Makedonski, MNT, Skopje
‘Little Prince’ – T. Prosev, MNT, Skopje
‘Ilinden’ – Prokopiev, MNT, Skopje
‘Carmen’ – Bisset, MNT, Skopje
‘Rigoletto’ – D. Verdi, MNT, Skopje
‘Tosca’ – D. Puccini, MNT, Skopje
‘Norma’ – Bellini, MNT, Skopje
‘Duke Igor’ – Borodin, MNT, Skopje
Ballet
‘Otello’ – J.Hanus, MNT, Skopje
‘The Ultimate Poem’ – T.Prosev, MNT, Skopje
‘Raijmonda’ – A. Glazunov, MNT, Skopje
‘Magic Love’ – M. de Falja, MNT, Skopje
‘Strausijada’ – Straus, MNT, Skopje
‘Bolero’ – Ravel, MNT, Skopje
‘Strausijada’ – National Theatre, Pristina, Yugoslavia

Television
‘The Letter of Love’ – Trifkovic, TV Skopje
‘Pavilion n. 6’ 
‘People, Birds’ – TV film, TV Skopje
‘The Sunset over the Land of Lake’ – T.Arsovski, TV series, TV Skopje

Films
‘Days of Temptations’ – K. Casule, Dir. V.Gavro, Vardar Film, Skopje
‘Until the Victory and Further’ – Dir. Z. Mitrovic, Vardar Film, Skopje
‘Republic in Flames’ – Dir. L. Georgievski, Vardar Film, Skopje
‘Macedonian Part of Hell’ – Dir. V. Mimica, Vardar Film, Skopje
‘The Longest Road’ – Dir. B. Gapo, Vardar Film, Skopje
‘The Time of Waters’ – Dir. B. Gapo, Vardar Film, Skopje
‘Voice’ – Jadran Film in co-production with RAI Film Italy 

Fashion shows
1960, Skopje
1962, Skopje
1964, Skopje

Individual awards
First Award ‘J. Cernodrimski’ for costume design in the play ‘Young Sons’ by V.Iljovski
First Award ‘J. Cernodrimski’ for costume design the play ‘Electra’ by Sophocles

Group awards
‘Silver Arena’ for the film ‘Longest Way’ 
First Award for TV Film in Bled ‘People, Birds’
Award of October for the play ‘Otello’

References

External links 
 

1932 births
2010 deaths
Serbian artists
Costume designers